Kuohijärvi is a lake in Finland. It is part of a chain of lakes that begins from the lakes Lummene and Vesijako at the drainage divide between the Kokemäenjoki and Kymijoki basins, flows westwards from there and drains into lake Mallasvesi through the lakes Kuohijärvi, Kukkia, Iso-Roine, Hauhonselkä and Ilmoilanselkä. The lake is part of the Kokemäenjoki basin and is located for the biggest part in the area of the city of Hämeenlinna (in the area of the former municipality of Hauho) in the Tavastia Proper region and for a smaller part in the municipality of Pälkäne (in the area of the former municipality of Luopioinen) in the Pirkanmaa region.

See also
List of lakes in Finland

References
 Finnish Environment Institute: Lakes in Finland
 Etelä-Savon ympäristökeskus: Saimaa, nimet ja rajaukset 

Kokemäenjoki basin
Landforms of Kanta-Häme
Lakes of Pälkäne
Lakes of Hämeenlinna